Magdalena Marotineanu (29 July 1931 – 2001) was a Romanian alpine skier. She competed in three events at the 1956 Winter Olympics.

References

1931 births
2001 deaths
Romanian female alpine skiers
Olympic alpine skiers of Romania
Alpine skiers at the 1956 Winter Olympics
Sportspeople from Bucharest